Total average is a baseball statistic devised by sportswriter Thomas Boswell and introduced in the 1978. It was also described in his 1982 article "Welcome to the world of Total Average where a walk is as good as a hit". It is designed to measure a hitter's overall offensive contributions, on the basis that "all bases are created equal". The statistic was included in issues of Inside Sports.

The definition of the statistic is simple. A player gets a credit for every base accumulated and a penalty for every out made. So a player gets one credit for a single, walk, stolen base or being hit by a pitch; two for a double; three for a triple; and four for a home run. A player's total average is calculated by summing the accumulated bases and dividing by the number of outs the player makes.

Formula
When initially announced in an article in Inside Sports, the formula for total average was:

Boswell revised the formula, which by 1981 had been modified to its final form:

where

TA = Total average
TB = Total bases
HBP = Hit by pitch
BB = Walks
SB = Stolen base
CS = Caught stealing
AB = At bats
H = Hits
GIDP = Grounded into double play

Like OPS, total average gives credit to players who draw a lot of walks and hit with a lot of power, such as Babe Ruth, Barry Bonds, Ted Williams and Frank Thomas.

Reception
Bill James was critical of total average, stating the "all bases are created unequal". For example, a walk and a single both advance the batter to first base, but a walk can advance baserunners only one base (or none, if there is no baserunner on first base), whereas a single can advance all baserunners. That is, "a single has more value". Likewise, a stolen base is treated the same as a hit, but does not add a baserunner or advance other baserunners as a hit does.

References

Batting statistics